Wilhelm Isak Wolf Ritter von Gutmann (18 August 1826 – 17 May 1895) was an Austrian entrepreneur. He founded and led the largest coal company in Austria-Hungary, was nobilitized in 1878 and was President of the Vienna Israelite Community from 1891 to 1892.

Beginnings
Wilhelm Gutmann came from a distinguished family of Lipník Jews. His father traded in textiles. Wilhelm studied theology in Hungary, but he was not very interested, so he started working as an educator, and later as a senior administrative assistant at a farm brewery with his distant relative. Then he became independent and began trading grains, but he failed again. Everything improved for him until he began to deal with plaster. Later trading with coal, he made it rich.

Family
Wilhelm Gutmann married his first wife Leonor Latzko (1827-1867), which the children Berthold (1856-1932), Max von Gutmann (1857-1930), and Rosa (1862-1930) were born. After the early death of his first wife, he married Ida Wodianer (1847-1924), printer daughter, Philipp editor and landlords (Fülöp) Wodianer (1820-1899). With her was Wilhelm von Gutmann four children: Marianne (1871), Moritz (1872-1934), Elizabeth (1875-1947) and Rudolf (1880-1966).

His daughter Elisabeth married in 1929 with Franz I, Prince of Liechtenstein (1853-1938), becoming the princess Elisabeth of Liechtenstein. The older sister Marianne was married to the English Zionist Sir Francis Abraham Montefiore (1860-1935).

References 

1826 births
1895 deaths
Austrian knights
Austrian Jews
Philanthropists from Vienna
Austrian mining businesspeople
19th-century Austrian businesspeople
Austrian patrons of the arts
People from Lipník nad Bečvou
19th-century philanthropists
Moravian Jews

House of Gutmann